John Brett Shirey (March 19, 1898 – October 19, 1966) was a college football player and engineer; once and a member of the American Society of Mechanical Engineers.

Auburn University
Shirey was a prominent running back for the Auburn Tigers of Auburn University. Shirey played for coach Mike Donahue from 1918 to 1922. He was a member of an All-time Auburn Tigers football team selected in 1935, as well as coach Donahue's all-time Auburn team.

1922
He was captain-elect in 1922, The Glomerata, Auburn's yearbook, says Shirey's "greatest delight is to catch a forward pass and serenade down the field like lightning.  Walter Camp gave Shirey honorable mention on his All-America team.

Early years
Shirey was born on March 19, 1898, in Texas to John Meredith Shirey and Loretta Hughes, and grew up in Guin, Alabama.

External links

References

American football halfbacks
Auburn Tigers football players
Players of American football from Alabama
People from Marion County, Alabama
1898 births
1966 deaths
All-Southern college football players